Maroua Brahmi (born September 19, 1988) is a Paralympic athlete from Tunisia competing mainly in category F32 throwing events. She is the 2016 Paralympic Champion in club throw category F32 and the F32 shot put.

Achievements
Impaired with cerebral palsy, Brahmi took to sport in 2008, she made her international debut in 2009, her first major international competition was at the 2011 IPC Athletics World Championships held in Christchurch, New Zealand, where she won a gold medal in the F31/F32/F51 club throw, she also came 11th in the F32/F34 shot put.

Brahmi competed in the 2012 Summer Paralympics in London, UK. There she won a gold medal in Women's club throw F31/32/51 and a bronze medal in the Women's shot put F32/33/34.

At the 2013 IPC Athletics World Championships in Lyon, France, on winning the gold medal in the club throw she broke the world record when throwing 24.15 meters, she also finished 4th in the shot put.

In the 2015 IPC Athletics World Championships in Doha, Qatar, she won gold again in the club throw she actually only beat Algerian thrower Mounia Gasmi by 4 centimeters and she followed that with the gold medal in the F32 shot put

She also managed to win two gold medals at the 2016 Summer Olympics, firstly winning the F32 club throw in a new world record distance of 26.93 meters, and again beating Mounia Gasmi who had to settle for silver medal again, then eight days later she won the F32 shot put throwing 5.76 meters which was a new Paralympic record, her nearest opponent was over a meter behind.

Athletics
 Women's Club Throw - F31/32/51
 Women's Shot Put - F32/33/34
 Women's Club throw F32
 Women's Shot put F32

References

External links 
 

Paralympic athletes of Tunisia
Athletes (track and field) at the 2012 Summer Paralympics
Athletes (track and field) at the 2016 Summer Paralympics
Paralympic gold medalists for Tunisia
Paralympic silver medalists for Tunisia
Paralympic bronze medalists for Tunisia
Living people
1988 births
World record holders in Paralympic athletics
Medalists at the 2012 Summer Paralympics
Medalists at the 2016 Summer Paralympics
Tunisian female shot putters
Paralympic medalists in athletics (track and field)
Athletes (track and field) at the 2020 Summer Paralympics
20th-century Tunisian women
21st-century Tunisian women